Charles Martin is a British television producer. In 2007, he was awarded a British Academy Children's Award. He made his film directorial debut with S.M.A.R.T. Chase in 2017.

Filmography

Director
The original Big Brother Eye Logo (2000)
The Giblet Boys (2005)
My Life as a Popat
"Juvenile Delinquent" (2007)
"Ghost" (2007)
"Girlfriend" (2007)
"Tit for Tat" (2007)
The Sarah Jane Adventures
"Warriors of Kudlak" (2 parts, 2007)
"The Lost Boy" (2 parts, 2007)
Skins Series 2 (2008)
Episode 9 - "Cassie" (Bryan Elsley)"
Episode 10 - "Everyone" (Jack Thorne)"
Skins Series 3 (2009)
Episode 1 - "Everyone" (Bryan Elsley)
Episode 5 - "Freddie" (Ben Sciffer)
Episode 7 - "JJ" (Bryan Elsley)
Episode 8 - "Effy" (Lucy Kirkwood)
Episode 9 - "Katie and Emily" (Malcolm Campbell and Bryan Elsley)
Married Single Other (2010)
"Episode 4"
"Episode 5"
"Episode 6"
Being Human Series 2 (2010)
"Episode 6"
"Episode 7"
"Episode 8"
Wallander Series III: "Before The Frost" (2011)
Run (2013)
"Episode 1: Carol"
"Episode 2: Ying"
New Worlds (2014)
"Episode 1"
"Episode 2"
"Episode 3"
"Episode 4"
The Smartened (2015)
"Episode 3: Julie"
"Episode 4: Victor"
Stonemouth (2015) (miniseries)
"Episode 1"
"Episode 2"
Marcella (2016-2018)
"Episode 1" (Season 1)
"Episode 2" (Season 1)
"Episode 3" (Season 1)
"Episode 1" (Season 3)
"Episode 2" (Season 3)
"Episode 3" (Season 3)
Counterpart (2018)
"Inside Out" (Season 2)
Wild Bill (2019) (miniseries)
"Episode 1"
"Episode 2"
For Life (2020)
"Episode 4: Marie"

References

British television directors
Living people
Year of birth missing (living people)